Bzenov (Hungarian: Berzenke) is a village and municipality in Prešov District in the Prešov Region of eastern Slovakia.

History
In historical records the village was first mentioned in 1423.

Geography
It has a population of about 767 people (2020-12-31).

Genealogical resources

The records for genealogical research are available at the state archive "Statny Archiv in Presov, Slovakia"

 Roman Catholic church records (births/marriages/deaths): 1720-1895 (parish B)
 Greek Catholic church records (births/marriages/deaths): 1812-1904 (parish B)
 Lutheran church records (births/marriages/deaths): 1704-1895 (parish B)

See also
 List of municipalities and towns in Slovakia

References

External links
 
 
Surnames of living people in Bzenov

Villages and municipalities in Prešov District
Šariš